Shahuwadi  (Vidhan Sabha constituency) is one of the 288 Vidhan Sabha (legislative assembly) constituencies of Maharashtra state, western India. This constituency is located in Kolhapur district.

Geographical scope
The constituency comprises Shauwadi Taluka, Kodoli, Kotoli, Panhala revenue circles and Panhala Municipal Council belonging to Panhala taluka.

Representatives
 2019: Vinay Kore, Jan Surajya Shakti
 2014: Satyajeet Patil, Shiv Sena.
 2009: Vinay Kore, Jan Surajya Shakti
 2004: Satyajeet Patil, Shiv Sena.
 1999: 	Gaikwad Sanjaysing Jayasingrao, Indian National Congress
 1995: 	Gaikwad Sanjaysinh Jayasingrao, Independent
 1990: 	Patil Babasaheb Yashwantrao,	Shiv Sena
 1985: 	Gaikwad Sanjaysinh Jaysingrao, Independent
 1980: 	Babasaheb Yeshwant Rao Patil, Indian National Congress
 1978: 	Gaikwad Udaysingrao Nanasaheb, Indian National Congress
 1972: 	Gaikwad U Rao Nanasaheb,	Indian National Congress

References

Assembly constituencies of Kolhapur district
Assembly constituencies of Maharashtra